Askern railway station was a station on the Askern branch line of the former Lancashire & Yorkshire Railway between Doncaster and Knottingley. It served the town of Askern in South Yorkshire, England.

History
It opened on 6 June 1848, and Askern,  from Knottingley, was one of the original stations. In the meantime, the WP&GR had amalgamated with the Manchester and Leeds Railway and others on 9 July 1847 to form the Lancashire and Yorkshire Railway (L&YR). The L&YR became part of the London Midland and Scottish Railway during the Grouping of 1923. The station was closed to regular passenger traffic from 10 March 1947, and to all passenger traffic from 27 September 1948. It remained open for goods traffic until October 1964. The station was passed over to the Eastern Region of British Railways on nationalisation. It had been reopened for limited service by 3 August 1980 but was subsequently closed and the platforms removed.

The site today
Trains still pass the site as the line is still open for freight traffic, and since May 2010, regular passenger trains operated by Grand Central pass through to and from London King's Cross.
In September 2008, as part of Doncaster Borough Councils report on rail corridors in the borough Askern, along with seven other sites, was listed as one of the stations suitable for reopening in the future.

Potential reopening
In late 2015 the reopening of the station was raised by the residents of Askern. They presented the petition to the Mayor of Doncaster Ros Jones. Due to the building of two semi-detached properties and two blocks of flats being built next to the original foundations of the station the place for the potential rebuild would have to be moved to a more convenient space.

In March 2020, a bid was made to the Restoring Your Railway fund to get funds for a feasibility study into reinstating the line and station through Askern to local passenger trains. This bid was unsuccessful.

References

 
Askern station on navigable O. S. map
 Report to Doncaster Borough Council on rail corridors and the possibility of reopening stations on them. (The Star, Saturday, 14 February 2009)

Disused railway stations in Doncaster
Former Lancashire and Yorkshire Railway stations
Railway stations in Great Britain opened in 1848
Railway stations in Great Britain closed in 1948
Askern